Isocoma hartwegii is a Mexican plant species in the family Asteraceae. It has been found in the states of Jalisco, Zacatecas, Aguascalientes, Hidalgo, Guanajuato, and San Luis Potosí.

Isocoma hartwegii is a subshrub. Each flower head has 13-22 disc flowers but no ray flowers.

References

hartwegii
Endemic flora of Mexico
Flora of Aguascalientes
Flora of Hidalgo (state)
Flora of Guanajuato
Flora of Jalisco
Flora of San Luis Potosí
Flora of Zacatecas
Plants described in 1884
Taxa named by Asa Gray
Taxa named by Edward Lee Greene